Iberochondrostoma lusitanicum, or the boga-portuguesa (its common names in English and Portuguese are the same), is a species of freshwater fish in the family Cyprinidae. It is found only in a very restricted area in Portugal, and is threatened by pollution and habitat destruction (dams).

Iberochondrostoma lusitanicum live in coastal rivers and terminal segments of main rivers, and reach a maximum length of about  TL.

References

Iberochondrostoma
Endemic fish of the Iberian Peninsula
Endemic fauna of Portugal
Fish described in 1980
Taxonomy articles created by Polbot